Thorneochloa is a genus of flowering plants belonging to the family Poaceae.

Its native range is California.

Species:

Thorneochloa diegoensis

References

Poaceae
Poaceae genera